The Chancellor (Swedish kansler) of Uppsala University was from 1622 to 1893 the head of the University of Uppsala, although in most academic and practical day-to-day matters it was run by the consistory (konsistorium) or board, and its chairman, the Rector magnificus.

There appears to have been a position as chancellor of the university already in its earliest period. According to the papal bull of Sixtus IV from 1477, the Archbishop of Uppsala, Jakob Ulfsson (the initiator of the university), was to be chancellor of the university. His successors appear not to have held this position, and during the 16th century and its long periods of dormancy of the university, no chancellor seems to have been appointed.

According to the privileges for Uppsala University promulgated by the regent Duke Charles (later king Charles IX) in 1595, the archbishop of Uppsala, the other bishops of the realm and the university were to elect the chancellor, who was then to be confirmed in his position by the king. In 1604 the university requested Prince Gustavus Adolphus as chancellor but received the reply that the Duke was still too young to understand these matters. In 1607 Count Abraham Brahe was appointed chancellor, but does not seem to have given much attention to the university, in contrast to the king's former tutor, the learned Johan Skytte, still remembered (among other things) for his donation of the Skyttean professorship, who was appointed chancellor in 1622 and can be said to begin the continuous chronological list of chancellors. Skytte was a member of the council of state (riksrådet) and the king ordered in 1625 that one of the councillors of state (riksråd) was always to hold the position of chancellor. The position of Pro-Chancellor (prokansler), deputy of the Chancellor, was always held ex officio by the Archbishop of Uppsala.

From the latter half of the 18th century until 1859 the position of chancellor was more often than not held by members of the royal family. For instance, Crown Prince Carl Johan, the former French Marshal Jean Baptiste Bernadotte and later king Charles XIV of Sweden, held the position from his election as heir to the throne and adoption by king Charles XIII. On his accession to the throne in 1818, his French-born son, Crown Prince Oscar (later Oscar I of Sweden), succeeded his father in the position, as did his son, Crown Prince Carl, when Oscar became king in 1844. Carl (the later Charles XV of Sweden) belonged to the first Swedish-born generation of the Bernadotte dynasty, and he and his brothers were also the first members of any Swedish royal dynasty to attend university since Charles X, who had been matriculated in Uppsala somewhat over 200 years earlier (1638). Carl was in fact chancellor already while he was himself a student at the university, and he remained so until his accession to the throne in 1859.

From 1861 the Chancellor of Uppsala University was also head of the Karolinska Institute (founded in 1810), and from 1859 until 1893 the Chancellorship of Uppsala University was always held by the same person as the Chancellorship of Lund University; from June 17, 1893, the positions were combined into a single one, with  the new University Chancellor having responsibility both for the two old universities and for the then recently founded University Colleges of Stockholm and Gothenburg (now the Universities of Stockholm and Gothenburg).

The role of the chancellor and his level of interference in university affairs depended on the aspirations or visions of the person holding the position and varied over time. With the new national university chancellor getting a supervisory role in relation to higher education as a whole from 1893, the local leadership role of the rector magnificus grew from the end of the 19th century and the terms of the rectors of the university lengthened from the one or two semesters at a time which had previously been the rule to several years or even a decade or two.

The position of Pro-Chancellor was abolished in 1934, but the last incumbent, Archbishop Erling Eidem retained it until his retirement in 1950.

Chancellors of the University of Uppsala

Chancellors of the Universities of Uppsala and Lund

Uppsala University
Rectors of universities and colleges in Sweden